Motihari College of Engineering, Motihari is a Government Engineering College fully funded by the government of Bihar, India. It is managed by Department of Science and Technology, Bihar, along with 38 Government Engineering Colleges of Bihar. The college is affiliated to Aryabhatta Knowledge University, Patna and approved by AICTE, New-Delhi.

History
Previously the institute was known as Indian College of Engineering-Motihari and was established in 1980. In 1994 all staffs and students were transferred to other engineering colleges of Bihar and the institute was shut down due to some political reason. Later in November 2008, the Government reopen the institute & the name was changed from Indian College of Engineering to Motihari College of Engineering.

Campus 
Motihari College of Engineering has a permanent campus of 48 acres located at Bairiya Fursatpur, Motihari, East-Champaran district of Bihar in India. It is 8 kilometers from nearest railway station Bapudham Motihari and 5 kilometers from Motihari bus-stand situated at Chhatauni. Regular auto rickshaw services are available from both places to the institute. It is approximately 2.5 kilometers from NH28A.

Departments 

Additional 12 seats (2nd year onward) is also sanctioned by AICTE for Lateral Entry students for all trades especially for Diploma holder or B.Sc. students.

Academics

Library 
The Library of MCE Motihari was started in early of 2008 with approximately 400 books and one online resource. As of 2021 Library have total 22,404 volumes of books available, which includes 4504 books for Civil, 4477 books for mechanical, 2949 books for CSE, 3919 books for EEE and 4330 books for General engineering subjects. Library caters to the information need of its highly demanding faculty members, students, research scholars as well as staff of the Institute, by offering a wide range of Information Technology (IT) based (and value added) services and products. The library remains open from 09:00 AM to 4:20 PM, on all working days throughout the year.

Admissions 

Since 2019, admissions are being taken by UGEAC-BCECEB, which considers JEE-Main merit list as the scoring criterion.
Students desirous to take admissions must appear in JEE-Main Exam, conducted by National Testing Agency(NTA).
Earlier, UG admissions were made through the Bihar Combined Entrance Competitive Examination(BCECE) conducted by Bihar Combined Entrance Competitive Examination Board, Under Bihar Combined Entrance Competitive Examination Act, 1995 of Bihar government.
Although, any student to get admitted in any of the engineering colleges located in Bihar, which uses UGEAC as the admission norm, requires the student to be a bonafide resident of Bihar.

Curriculum 
The B. Tech. program consists of eight semesters spread over four academic years. Motihari College of Engineering is affiliated to Aryabhatta Knowledge University, Patna. M.Tech. in Computer Science & Engineering and other specialization is expected to start from upcoming academic year after getting mandatory approval from AICTE-New Delhi.

Student life

Hostel facilities 

MCE Motihari has two boy’s hostels namely old boy's hostel & new boy's hostel and one girl’s hostel.
All the hostels are very close to the academic complex. Presently over 500 students are residing in these hostels.
There are two separate Boy’s hostels one for 1st year and 2nd year and second For 3rd year and Final year.
Every Hostel has approximately 300 rooms.
There are also single seated rooms are available which are normally allocated to final year and pre-final year boarders.
Multi-seated accommodation constitute 2-seated and 3-Seated rooms which are allotted to the students of 1st and 2nd year.
There is a lush of greenery around the hostels.
In addition to the adequate health care facilities. The hostels are equipped with Football, Basketball, badminton, chess, carrom and table tennis facilities. The Boys’ hostel campus has a basketball court, a volleyball court, and badminton court. A football-cum-cricket ground will also be available.
There are three students’ mess one in girl’s hostel and another two are in boy’s hostel and there is also one canteen in the hostel-campus.
Additionally one boys hostel of 300 capacity and one girls hostel of 150 capacity is proposed by college and an amount of Rs.32 lakh is also sanctioned by Department of Science & Technology, Government of Bihar. The construction of new hostels is expected to start soon.

See also 
 List of institutions of higher education in Bihar
 Education in Patna
 Education in Bihar
 Education in India

External links 
 Official website
 BCECE Board website
 Aryabhatta Knowledge University website
 DST, Bihar website

Engineering colleges in Bihar
Colleges affiliated to Aryabhatta Knowledge University
East Champaran district
1958 establishments in Bihar
Educational institutions established in 1958